The Sailfish-class submarines of the United States Navy, launched in 1955-56, were the first to be built expressly for radar picket service and, at the time, were the largest conventionally powered submarines in the United States Navy. Only  and the s from the 1920s were larger. The Sailfishes were initially equipped with large BPS-2 and BPS-3 radars in and aft of the sail. They were designed under project SCB 84 for a high surface speed; however, their speed achieved was not significantly faster than converted World War II radar picket submarines. Commissioned in 1956, they served in the radar picket role until early 1961, when the submarine radar picket mission ended fleetwide. Airborne radar had superseded it with the deployment of the Grumman WF-2 Tracer. Modernized under the Fleet Rehabilitation and Modernization II (FRAM II) program 1964-66, both submarines served until decommissioning in the late 1970s.

Design
This class was an attempt to improve on the speed and surfaced seakeeping qualities of the converted World War II submarines previously used as radar pickets. They were equipped with a BPS-2 air search radar in the sail and a BPS-3 height finder on a pedestal aft of the sail. Despite a  diesel plant, their surfaced speed was only a few knots more than the effective speed of their smaller predecessors, so they were incapable of effectively escorting carrier task forces. After the submarine radar picket role ended in 1961, they were reclassified as attack submarines (SS). In 1964-66 they were modernized under the FRAM II program, with Salmon temporarily receiving Regulus missile guidance equipment. Both received BQG-4 PUFFS fire control sonar at this time.

Ships in class

References

 Gardiner, Robert and Chumbley, Stephen, Conway's All the World's Fighting Ships 1947–1995, p. 614 London: Conway Maritime Press, 1995. .

External links
 NavSource.org Postwar Diesel Submarines photo gallery index

Submarine classes
 
 Sailfish class
 Sailfish class